National Trust Magazine is the members’ publication of National Trust for Places of Historic Interest or Natural Beauty. With a readership of over 4 million (ABC 2,165,142) it currently has the highest magazine circulation in Britain. Three issues are sent out every year - spring, summer and autumn – and are delivered as part of the National Trust members’ mailout, which includes local newsletters and other information for Trust members.

History
The first issue appeared in May 1932 and featured the Trust’s newest acquisition, Montacute House, on the cover. It was 8 pages long and titled ‘The National Trust Bulletin’.

Over time the magazine has been variously known as,
1932–1935: The National Trust Bulletin
1935–1939: National Trust News
1939: The Trust in War-Time
1947: National Trust Newsletter (the first Trust publication since 1939 due to wartime paper shortages)
1948: National Trust News Bulletin
1948–1954: News Bulletin
1955–1967: News Letter
1968–1970: Newsletter to members of The National Trust
1971–1973: National Trust News
1973–1985: National Trust
1985–Present: The National Trust Magazine

The number of issues has varied from 1 to 4 per year, although since 1984 the magazine has been tri-annual. The current numbering system considers issue number 1 to be the spring 1968 issue (numbered as such due to a redesign in that year). In fact 50 issues preceded the spring 1968 edition; therefore the summer 2016 magazine was the 218th National Trust Members’ publication.

Staff
Previous editors include
Robin Wright: 1982–1985
Lawrence Rich: 1985–1988
Sarah Jane Forder: 1989–1996
Amanda Evans: ‘acting editor’ autumn 1996
Gina Guarnieri: 1997–1999
Anne Johnson: autumn 1999
Gaynor Aaltonen: 2000–2006
Sue Herdman: 2006–2012
Clare Gogerty: spring 2013
Debbie Schrieber 'acting editor' summer 2013
Sally Palmer: 2013–present

The team has variously included Executive Editors, News Editors, Deputy Editors, Art Directors over the years.
Currently the magazine employs three full-time editorial staff: the Editor and two Assistant Editors, as well as a Content Researcher who is employed by National Trust Images. It also employs freelance designers, a sub-editor and proof reader.

Content
The magazine features articles on interiors, gardens, landscape, wildlife, family, food, environment and all areas of National Trust life.

Regular pages

Seasonal View

A double-page picture feature, encapsulating the season.

News

A round-up of the top stories and events from inside the Trust, with columns by the Director General and other key staff.

From You

Letters, emails and pictures from members.

Trust on screen

The latest filming news from Trust places.

Shopping

Highlights from the latest Trust retail ranges.

How to

Guide to re-creating a Trust feature in your own home or garden.

Bookshelf

The latest books, videos and apps from the Trust.

Crossword

The enduringly popular prize crossword.

In conversation with

Each issue we have a chat with someone from the Trust.

In the news
The National Trust Magazine has sparked features in broadsheets, such as the Telegraph (on the story of Ferguson’s Gang), and the Sunday Times (following a feature on Slavery).

Advertising
The very first advert to appear in the magazine was in the 1968 issue. Redactive handle the advertising for the magazine today.

Talking Magazine
An audio version of each issue is produced. The talking magazine is presented by John Waite, and regularly features the voices of Malcolm Billings, Louise Fryer, Brian Perkins, Libby Purves, and Charlotte Green. In addition to features, which are read aloud, extra studio interviews and outside broadcasts are conducted with authors, Trust staff, and figures mentioned in the magazine.

Contributors
Notable contributors to the magazine have included:

Anthony Blunt
James Lees-Milne
Alan Titchmarsh
Clough Williams-Ellis
George Trevelyan
Graham Stuart Thomas
Peter Thornton
Nigel Nicolson
Robert Lassam
Sir Alan Bowness CBE
David Bellamy
Nicholas Wollaston
Hunter Davies
Sue Arnold
Jancis Robinson
Gervase Jackson-Stops
Anna Pavord
Miles Kington
Libby Purves
Jonathon Porritt
Rumer Godden
Max Egremont
Roy Lancaster
Brian Redhead
Richard Mabey
Maev Kennedy
Simon Jenkins
Patrick Wright
Colin Luckhurst

More recent contributors include:

Robert Macfarlane
Billy Bragg
Benedict Blathwayt
Lars Tharp
Dan Cruickshank
Kate Colquhoun
Anthony Lambert
Marcel Theroux
John Vidal
Clement Freud
Rosie Boycott
Jonathan Meades
Rachel Johnson
Adam Nicolson
Oz Clarke
Michael Holroyd
Anish Kapoor

Photography
Joe Cornish
John Millar
Paul Harris
Megan Taylor
Oskar Proctor
Sylvaine Poitau
Chris Lacey
James Dobson
William Shaw
Layton Thompson
Cristian Barnett
Andrew Montgomery

Summer 2016 new-look
From the summer 2016 issue National Trust Magazine updated its design and structure, following reader research. It features improved navigation and a cleaner layout. New content includes fun pages for children and highlights of events across the UK. The aim is to help readers to make the most of their membership and find out more about the Trust’s work looking after special places forever, for everyone.

References

External links
The National Trust Magazine Online

1932 establishments in the United Kingdom
History magazines published in the United Kingdom
Magazines established in 1932
National Trust
Triannual magazines published in the United Kingdom